Abdul Haseem Khan (born 15 July 1987 in Karachi) is a field hockey player from Pakistan.

Career

2010
In November, Khan was part of the gold medal winning team at the Asian Games in Guangzhou, China.

See also
Pakistan national field hockey team

References

External links
 

1987 births
Living people
Pakistani male field hockey players
Asian Games gold medalists for Pakistan
Asian Games silver medalists for Pakistan
Asian Games medalists in field hockey
Field hockey players at the 2010 Asian Games
Field hockey players at the 2014 Asian Games
Field hockey players at the 2012 Summer Olympics
Olympic field hockey players of Pakistan
Medalists at the 2010 Asian Games
Medalists at the 2014 Asian Games
People from Karachi
2010 Men's Hockey World Cup players